Lewis and Clark State Park is a public recreation area occupying  on the south shore of  Lewis and Clark Lake (a.k.a. Sugar Lake) in Buchanan County, Missouri. The state park features camping, picnicking, and fishing.

History
The tract was acquired in 1934 as the gift of a group of Buchanan County sportsmen and was originally named Sugar Lake State Park. The name was changed in 1938 to honor Lewis and Clark, who are believed to have discovered the lake, naming it Gosling Lake, on their expedition in 1804-1806.

The Sugar Lake State Park Open Shelter was built in 1934 by a Civilian Conservation Corps company who encamped briefly at the park.  It is a stone picnic shelter on a poured concrete foundation. The shelter was listed on the National Register of Historic Places in 1985.

References

External links

 Lewis and Clark State Park Missouri Department of Natural Resources
 Lewis and Clark State Park Map Missouri Department of Natural Resources

State parks of Missouri
Protected areas of Buchanan County, Missouri
Protected areas established in 1934
Civilian Conservation Corps in Missouri
Buildings and structures on the National Register of Historic Places in Missouri
Buildings and structures completed in 1934
Buildings and structures in Buchanan County, Missouri
National Register of Historic Places in Buchanan County, Missouri
1934 establishments in Missouri